Tampa Review is a literary magazine produced at The University of Tampa in Tampa, Florida. It was founded in 1964 as the Tampa Poetry Review and changed to its current name in 1988.

Tampa Review has been instrumental in promoting Florida-based writers such as Lisbeth Kent, Judith Hemsshemeyer, Lola Haskins, and Dionisio Martinez in the national stage.  Work that has appeared in the journal has also been reprinted in The Best American Poetry series and has won the Pushcart Prize.  Nationally known writers whose work has appeared in the journal include Amina Gautier, Robert Dana, Margaret Gibson, Peter Meinke, Enid Shomer, Jacob Appel and Samrat Upadhyay.

In 1995, the Council of Editors of Learned Journals awarded the Tampa Review its Phoenix Award for "significant editorial achievement."

Masthead

  Editor:  Richard Mathews
  Fiction Editors: Andrew Plattner, Yuly Restrepo
  Nonfiction Editor: Daniel Dooghan,  Elizabeth Winston
  Poetry Editor: Erica Dawson
 Editorial Assistants:  Sean Donnelly,  Joshua Steward
 Staff Assistant:  Megan C. Wiedeman
 Contributing & Consulting Editor:  J. M. Lennon

See also
List of literary magazines

References

External links
Tampa Review website

Poetry magazines published in the United States
Biannual magazines published in the United States
Magazines established in 1964
Magazines published in Florida
University of Tampa
1964 establishments in Florida
Mass media in the Tampa Bay area